Mukesh Suryan was the mayor of South Delhi Municipal Corporation (SDMC). He represented Sagarpur West ward in the Najafgarh Zone of SDMC. He is a member of Bharatiya Janata Party and hails from Uttar Pradesh.

References 

Mayors of South Delhi
Bharatiya Janata Party politicians from Delhi
Living people
Year of birth missing (living people)